The 2019–20 Damehåndboldligaen (known as HTH Ligaen for sponsorship reasons) was the 84th season of Damehåndboldligaen, Denmark's premier handball league. Team Esbjerg were the defending champions and HH Elite were promoted from the 1. division.

Team information

Head coaches

Regular season

Standings

Results

In the table below the home teams are listed on the left and the away teams along the top. Last updated on 10 March 2020.

Top goalscorers

Regular season

Monthly awards

Number of teams by regions

References

External links
 Danish Handball Federaration 

Handboldligaen
Handboldligaen
Damehåndboldligaen